The following lists events that happened during 2001 in the Iraqi Republic.

Incumbents
 President: Saddam Hussein
 Prime Minister: Saddam Hussein
 Vice President: Taha Muhie-eldin Marouf 
 Vice President: Taha Yassin Ramadan

Events

February
 February 16 - British and U.S. forces carry out bombing raids, attempting to disable Iraq's air defense network.
 February 17 - Baghdad is bombed by US and UK war planes, killing three people.
 February 19 - The Arab world and the UN Security Council criticise the attacks by the US and UK two days ago.
 February 20 - The critics of the raids by the UK and US claim that foreign ministers are planning to refine the sanctions against Iraq.

August
August 27 - A U.S. Military RQ-1B Predator unmanned aerial vehicle failed to return from a routine reconnaissance mission, Iraq claims to have shot it down.

September
 September 11 - 2,996 killed in the September 11 attacks on the World Trade Center in New York City, New York, The Pentagon in Arlington, Virginia, and Shanksville, Pennsylvania. Saddam Hussein immediately declares that his government played no part in the attacks. Also that day a U.S. military RQ-1B Predator unmanned aerial vehicle crashed near Basra, Iraq claims to have shot it down.

External links

References

 
Iraq
Years of the 21st century in Iraq
2000s in Iraq
Iraq